Auvernier Castle Cellars or Caves du Chateau Auvernier is a Swiss Winery that cultivates about 40 hectares of grapevines and produce over 10 wine types.

The basic facts:
The Auvernier Castle winery is one of the oldest in Switzerland and is a family business from its foundation in 1603.
The local Chardonnay grape is of the best quality for the white wine production.
The main source for the red wine production is the Pinot noir grape type.

See also 
List of oldest companies

References

External links 

Facebook page
Note in the book "Anthony Dias Blue's Pocket Guide to Wine 2006"

Wineries of Switzerland
Companies established in the 17th century
17th-century establishments in Switzerland
Food and drink companies established in the 17th century